Rhyzodiastes frater is a species of ground beetle in the subfamily Rhysodinae. It was described by Antoine Henri Grouvelle in 1903. It is found in Borneo, with records from both Sarawak (Malaysia) and Kalimantan (Indonesia).

References

Rhyzodiastes
Beetles of Indonesia
Insects of Malaysia
Endemic fauna of Borneo
Beetles described in 1903